Bohot is a village in northern Bulgaria. It is located in the municipality of Pleven in the Pleven Province.

Bohot Nunatak in Antarctica is named after the village.

Villages in Pleven Province